Ezekiel Ayo Awosoga (1950-2020) was an Anglican bishop in Nigeria: he was the Bishop of Ijebu from his consecration on January 28, 2005 until his death in 2020.

He was educated at Immanuel College, Ibadan and ordained in 1994. In his own words "I did all that was assigned to me as vicar of churches, youth chaplain and chairman of the Board of Evangelism".

Before his election as bishop, he was Provost of the Cathedral of Our Saviour in Ijebu-Ode.

Notes

Anglican bishops of Ijebu
21st-century Anglican bishops in Nigeria
2020 deaths
1950 births
Alumni of Immanuel College of Theology, Ibadan